"Cool Again" is a song by American country music singer Kane Brown. It was released on April 22, 2020, through RCA Records Nashville as the lead single from his third EP Mixtape, Vol. 1.

Content
Brown wrote the song with Josh Hoge, Matt McGinn, and Lindsay Rimes at a songwriter's retreat during the wintertime. Rimes also co-produced the song with Dann Huff.

According to Brown, they wrote the song's instrumentation first before coming up with the concept of "a relationship turned cold". In August 2020, Brown remixed the song featuring rapper Nelly. This remix also received a music video featuring the two singers on a beach.

Charts

Weekly charts

Year-end charts

Certifications

References

2020 singles
2020 songs
Kane Brown songs
Nelly songs
Male–female vocal duets
Songs written by Kane Brown
Songs written by Josh Hoge
Songs written by Matt McGinn (songwriter)
Songs written by Lindsay Rimes
Song recordings produced by Dann Huff
RCA Records Nashville singles